Matthew Bryan Martin (born May 8, 1989) is a Canadian professional ice hockey winger for the New York Islanders of the National Hockey League (NHL). Martin is known for his strong checking abilities. Martin also holds the NHL record for most hits in a season. In the NHL, Martin has been described as both an enforcer and a grinder.

Playing career

Amateur
Martin tried out for his local AAA team, the Windsor Jr. Spitfires, but was cut and played AA hockey for the Lasalle Sabres. In 2005-06 he made the Blenheim Blades Jr.C. club as a free agent. In 2006, he tried out with the Sarnia Sting of the Ontario Hockey League as a walk-on, and made the team, playing on a line with Steven Stamkos. He would eventually serve as the captain of the Sarnia Sting.

Professional
Martin was drafted in the fifth round, 148th overall by the New York Islanders in the 2008 NHL Entry Draft. Martin was signed by the Islanders to a three-year entry-level contract on September 4, 2009. Martin scored his first NHL goal on October 29, 2010 against Alex Auld of the Montreal Canadiens.

On September 15, 2012, Martin agreed to a four-year contract with the Islanders.

During the 2014–15 NHL season, Martin set the NHL record for most hits in a single season, recording 382 checks.

The following season, during the 2015–16 campaign, Martin's line, consisting of himself, Casey Cizikas, and Cal Clutterbuck was considered to be one of the best fourth lines in the NHL by ice hockey analysts.

On July 1, 2016, as an unrestricted free agent for the first time in his career, Martin and the Toronto Maple Leafs agreed to a four-year, $10 million contract, worth an average of $2.5 million a season. In his first season with Toronto, Martin assumed his role as an enforcer, playing on the fourth line for the team and protecting the plethora of rookies on the roster from hits by other players, and fighting those that ran teammates. The team would qualify for the post-season, with Martin picking up two points in the second game of the series which would see the Maple Leafs lose in six contests to the top seeded Washington Capitals.

During the 2017–18 season, Martin's playing numbers diminished and during a stretch in January and February he was a healthy scratch for 18 consecutive games. He ended the regular season with 12 points in 50 games. On April 23, 2018, Martin was nominated for the King Clancy Memorial Trophy, as a player who best exemplifies leadership qualities and made humanitarian contributions to the community.

On July 3, 2018, after two seasons with the Maple Leafs, Martin was traded back to the New York Islanders by Toronto in exchange for Eamon McAdam.

During his first season back with the Islanders, Martin was placed on injured reserve on November 15 due to an upper-body injury that occurred on November 1. At the time, he had scored three goals in 11 games with the Islanders, matching his total from Toronto last season. He was activated off injured reserve on November 26.

On January 11, 2021, Martin was signed to a four-year, $6 million extension with the Islanders.

Personal life
Martin is married to Sydney Esiason, the daughter of former NFL player Boomer Esiason. On March 18, 2018, Martin and Esiason announced their engagement via Twitter. They married on June 29, 2019. The couple has one daughter, Windsor, born July 14, 2020.

He has an older brother who also played hockey and encouraged him to get involved in the sport.

In the summer of 2015, Martin started the Matt Martin Foundation to raise money for causes such as NYPD Widows and Children’s Fund, the Association for Children with Down Syndrome, the Boomer Esiason Foundation for Cystic Fibrosis and the Islanders Children’s Foundation. In 2016, Martin was named a finalist for the NHL Foundation Player Award due to his involvement in the community and charity work.

Career statistics

References

External links
 

1989 births
Living people
Bridgeport Sound Tigers players
Canadian ice hockey forwards
Ice hockey people from Ontario
New York Islanders draft picks
New York Islanders players
Sarnia Sting players
Sportspeople from Windsor, Ontario
Toronto Maple Leafs players